Apantesis arge, the arge moth or arge tiger moth, is a moth of the family Erebidae. The species was first described by Dru Drury in 1773. It is found in North America from Quebec and Maine to Florida, West to New Mexico, North to North Dakota and Ontario.

Adults are on wing from April to September in most of the range and from July to September in Quebec. There are two generations per year in the south and one or two in the North.

The larvae feed on the leaves of corn, dock, lambs-quarter, Chenopodium, grape, plantain, Opuntia, smartweed and sunflower.

This species was formerly a member of the genus Grammia, but was moved to Apantesis along with the other species of the genera Grammia, Holarctia, and Notarctia.

References

Arctiina
Moths described in 1773
Moths of North America
Taxa named by Dru Drury